This is a list of Danish boxing world champions who have won major world titles from the "Big four" governing bodies in professional boxing namely the World Boxing Association (WBA), World Boxing Council (WBC), International Boxing Federation (IBF) and World Boxing Organization (WBO).

List of men's professional boxing world champions

The following is a list of Danish boxing champions who have held titles from one or more of the "Big Four" organizations (WBA, WBC, IBF, WBO) and The Ring.

WBA has four recognized world champions, Super, Undisputed, Unified and Regular. The highest tier title is considered the primary champion of the division. Only boxers who are in the primary champion lineage are listed.

The ranking of WBA's primary champions are as follows:SuperUndisputedUnifiedRegular''

Other former international/national-world boxing commissions and organizations from the beginning of boxing are also included here:
 New York State Athletic Commission  (NYSAC)
 National Boxing Association (NBA) - changed its name to World Boxing Association (WBA) in 1962

Note 
Interim titles are not included unless they get promoted to the official champion.
For WBA champions, only champions in the WBA primary lineage are listed.

List of WBA secondary champions

See also

List of WBA world champions
List of WBC world champions
List of IBF world champions
List of WBO world champions
List of The Ring world champions
List of undisputed boxing champions

References

External links

world boxing champions, List of Danish
Danish world boxing champions, List of

Danish
Boxing in Denmark